The 1993–94 Alpha Ethniki was the 58th season of the highest football league of Greece. The season began on 22 August 1993 and ended on 24 April 1994. AEK Athens won their third consecutive and 11th Greek title.

Teams

Stadia and personnel

 1 On final match day of the season, played on 24 April 1994.

League table

Results

Top scorers

External links
Official Greek FA Site
RSSSF
Greek SuperLeague official Site
SuperLeague Statistics
 

Alpha Ethniki seasons
Greece
1